The Blood Pressure Association (or BPA) is a British charitable organisation, established in October 2000, that seeks to provide information and support to people with high blood pressure (also known as hypertension) and to educate the general public about the importance of blood pressure to health.

It is based at St George's Hospital in Tooting, London.

Know Your Numbers
Every second week of September the Association runs a Blood Pressure Testing Week as part of its Know Your Numbers campaign, where doctors, nurses, pharmacists and trainers offer free blood pressure tests in hospitals, pharmacies, health centres and shopping centres throughout the UK. Sir David Attenborough was appointed patron of the Association in May 2005.

See also
 National Blood Service

References

Organizations established in 2000
Blood pressure
Health charities in the United Kingdom
Heart disease organizations
St George's, University of London
2000 establishments in the United Kingdom